Pinctada imbricata is a species of bivalve belonging to the family Pteriidae.

The species has almost cosmopolitan distribution.

References

Pteriidae